Tallahassee is an unincorporated community in Jeff Davis County, Georgia, United States. There were 13 households and the population was 32 as of 2000.

Unincorporated communities in Jeff Davis County, Georgia
Unincorporated communities in Georgia (U.S. state)